is one of the original 40 throws of Judo as developed by Kanō Jigorō. It belongs to the first group,
Dai Ikkyo, of the traditional throwing list, Gokyo (no waza), of Kodokan Judo. It is also included in the current 67 Throws of Kodokan Judo.It is classified as a foot technique, Ashi-Waza.

Technique description 

Graphic
from http://www.judoinfo.com/techdraw.htm

In right Ouchi Gari, tori uses his right leg to reap uke's left leg from the inside while pulling uke down. In competition, the reaping action of the classical variation is sometimes replaced with a hooking or lifting motion, and the left hand can be used to lift or block uke's other leg while reaping the other.

Further reading

References 

 Ohlenkamp, Neil (2006) Judo Unleashed basic reference on judo. .

External links 
 "JudoInfo.com" Animations and drawings

Judo technique
Throw (grappling)